Iryna Stelmakh (born 18 August 1993) is a Ukrainian handball player for RK Podravka Koprivnica and the Ukrainian national team.

References

1993 births
Living people
Ukrainian female handball players
RK Podravka Koprivnica players
Sportspeople from Ternopil Oblast